Marduk-zâkir-šumi II was a Babylonian nobleman who served briefly as King of Babylon for a few months in 703 BC, following a revolt against the rule of the Assyrian king Sennacherib.  He was soon overthrown and replaced by the former Chaldean king, Marduk-apla-iddina II.

703 BC deaths
8th-century BC Babylonian kings
Year of birth unknown